Jana Novotná defeated Mary Pierce in the final, 7–6, 6–3, 6–2 to win the singles tennis title at the 1997 WTA Tour Championships.

Steffi Graf was the two-time defending champion, but did not compete this year.

Seeds
A champion seed is indicated in bold text while text in italics indicates the round in which that seed was eliminated.

  Martina Hingis (quarterfinals)
  Jana Novotná (champion)
  Lindsay Davenport (first round)
  Amanda Coetzer (first round)
  Monica Seles (first round)
  Iva Majoli (quarterfinals)
  Mary Pierce (final)
  Irina Spîrlea (semifinals)

Main draw

 NB: The final was a best of five sets while all other rounds were the best of three sets.

See also
WTA Tour Championships appearances

External links
 1997 Chase Championships Draw

Singles 1997
Singles